Wazed Ali Sumon  is a Bangladeshi film director. He was born in Rajshahi district, Bangladesh. At the beginning of his career, he used to collborate with Shahin. Their directorial duo was known as Shahin-Sumon. But from 2014, both started working separately. Sumon is making feature films continuously in Dhallywood.

Career 
Wazed Ali Sumon started his career as an assistant director in Bangladesh Film Development Corporation. At the beginning of his career, he started making film as a co-director. After that, he started making films jointly with film director Ruhul Kuddus Khan Shaheen. Their directorial duo was known as Shaheen Sumon. After long time they get separate and making film with single direction.

Filmography

References

External links 
 

Bangladeshi film directors
Bangladeshi television directors
Bengali film directors
Living people
People from Dhaka
People from Rajshahi District
Year of birth missing (living people)